URP, urp or Urp may refer to:

 Ukrainian Radical Party
 Ukrainian Republican Party
 Union of the Russian People
 United Republican Party (Kenya)
 United Resources Party, based in Papua New Guinea
 United Rhodesia Party
 ARP 410 Airlines, based in Kyiv, Ukraine (by ICAO code)
 Uru-Pa-In language, spoken in Southern Brazil (by ISO code)